Georges P. Vanier Secondary School is a high school in Courtenay, British Columbia, Canada.  The school was named after Georges P. Vanier, one of Canada's most popular Governors General.

History
The school opened in January 1968, completing a move of students from the old Courtenay Senior High School.  Vanier was built to have a capacity of 1200 students.  The school population grew to more than 1700 in the early 2000s, with the addition of 36 portable classrooms. This led to the opening of Mark R. Isfeld Senior Secondary School, which became the third district secondary school in the early 2000s.

Vanier has primarily been the regional secondary school in the Comox Valley School District, serving students from Hornby and Denman Islands, the City of Courtenay, and the communities of Dove Creek, Merville, Black Creek, Saratoga and Miracle Beach communities up to the Oyster River, which separates the Comox Valley School District from the Campbell River district.

In 2016, the school started a $33.8 million upgrade.

Facilities
The school facility has a natural setting on  located next to the Comox Valley Sports Centre, community track and playing fields.   The grounds include three playing fields and access to a community all-weather field and a community daycare primarily built for teen mothers.  The school includes the Vanier Studio Theatre, a full teaching cafeteria, and a large technology education wing that includes shops for house construction, auto mechanics, small engines, metalworking, electronics/robotics, woodwork and drafting.

International exchange
Vanier has established links with four sister schools, one in Italy, one in Wales and two in Japan.

Athletics 
Georges P. Vanier Secondary competes in Zone E (Vancouver Island) of BC School Sports. The sports teams are:

Fall 

 Volleyball (Boys and Girls)
 Cross Country
 Swimming
 Soccer (Senior Boys)

Winter 

 Basketball (Boys and Girls)
 Gymnastics
 Wrestling

 Ski and Snowboarding

Spring 

 Track and Field
 Mountain Biking
 Soccer (Senior Girls)
 Rugby (Boys and Girls)
 Golf
 Ultimate Frisbee

The school won the BC provincial championships in senior girls rugby in 2018-2019

National Championships

Robotics, 2004, 2010
Robotics World Championships, 2010
Improv, 2009, 2010
Improv, Destination Imagination Global Championships, 2018

Notable alumni
Kim Cattrall, actress
Colin Hansen, BC finance minister
Barry Pepper, actor
Simon Nessman, model 
Cameron Levins, Olympian
Geoff Kabush, Olympian

References

Courtenay, British Columbia
High schools in British Columbia
Educational institutions established in 1968
1968 establishments in British Columbia

